The Battle of Koçhisar (Turkish: Koçhisar Muharebesi) took place in May 1516 nearby Kızıltepe and ended in a decisive victory for the Ottoman Empire over the Safavid Empire. It marked the halt of Safavid expansion to the west. Koçhisar was just one of the many battles during the 41 years of destructive war between the two empires, which only ended in 1555 with the Treaty of Amasya. Safavid commander Karahan Ustajlu was killed at the battlefield and most of his men were slaughtered by the Ottomans.

At Koçhisar, the Ottoman army had musketeers and artillery while the Safavid army did not possess either. Karahan Ustajlu, the brother of the Safavid Governor of Diyarbakır Mohammad Khan Ustajlu who was killed at the Battle of Chaldiran, and the commander of the Safavid army, was killed during the battle. After this victory; Mardin, Urfa, Hasankeyf, Raqqa, Mosul and other important cities were besieged and captured by Bıyıklı Mehmed Pasha’s army.

References

Sources 

 Hoca Sadeddin Efendi. (1585). Tâcü’t-Tevârîh - IV. İstanbul 
 Göyünç, N. (1969). XVI’ncı Yüzyılda Mardin Sancağı. İstanbul: İstanbul Üniversitesi Edebiyat Fakültesi. 
 T.C. Genelkurmay Başkanlığı. (1990). Yavuz Sultan Selim ve Mısır Seferi. Ankara: Genelkurmay Basımevi.
 https://islamansiklopedisi.org.tr/biyikli-mehmed-pasa

Citations 

1516 in the Ottoman Empire
16th century in Iran
Battles involving the Ottoman Empire
Battles involving Safavid Iran
History of Diyarbakır
History of Mardin Province
Ottoman–Persian Wars
Shia–Sunni sectarian violence